Jean-Paul Gut, born on 1 July 1961, was executive director of marketing, strategy and international development at EADS. In 2007, he founded a consulting company, Coolmore International, based in London.

Biography

Studies
Jean Paul Gut graduated from the Institut d’Etudes Politiques de Paris with a master's degree in Economy.

Career

Matra
Jean-Paul Gut's career began in 1983 as Export Vice President for Matra Défense, part of the Matra Group.
In 1988, he became the Export Marketing and Sales Executive Director. In 1990, he served as Executive Vice President of International Operations for Matra Défense Espace. Three years later, 1993, he advanced to the position of Senior Executive Vice President, in charge of international operations for the Lagardère Group. In 1996, he became the Senior Executive Vice President for Matra BAE Dynamics.

In March 1998, Jean-Paul Gut joined the Board of Management of the Lagardère Group as Managing Director, in charge of international operations and State of the Art Technology Sector. He also became as a member of the executive management of EADS Company South Africa (Pty) Ltd. On May 11, 2005, Jean-Paul Gut served as the Director of Dassault Aviation SA, and as Executive Director of European Aeronautic Defence & Space Co. N.V.

EADS (now Airbus)
When EADS was created in 2000, he became a member of the board and member of the executive committee. In 2005, he was promoted to the position of executive director of EADS, and director of EADS International. 

In June 2006, when Jean-Louis Gergorin left EADS, he was assigned to be in charge of the company's global strategy, thus becoming executive director of marketing and strategy, overseeing all international operations. 
A year later, in June 2007, he officially resigned from EADS. His severance pay was said to be 2.8 million euros, the equivalent of a 24-month salary for 24 years worked at the company. Right before he left EADS, he struck a 16 billion euro deal with Qatar Airways for the sale of 80 A350.
In fact, he received more than 80 million euros, in a covered payment, as was revealed later by investigations newspapers.

Consulting Company
Jean-Paul Gut created his own consulting company in London, catering to French and European companies looking to expand internationally, and connecting foreign investors with European corporations working on large-scale development projects. One of his main clients is Airbus, thus he remains an influential person within the company.
Jean-Paul Gut is also the founder of the ARMAT GROUP in 2008, focusing on private equity, real estate and asset backed finance.

The EADS case 
In June 2008, Jean-Paul Gut was indicted of insider trading when he was EADS’ executive director of marketing and strategy. The EADS case, which goes back to early 2006, arose after it was revealed that hundreds of EADS employees had sold their shares a few weeks before Airbus announced delivery delays of the A380, which caused Airbus to plummet in the stock market, losing 26% of its share price in one day. In 2006, Jean-Paul Gut had sold 175,000 shares for a 1,773,250 euros capital gain. Jean-Paul Gut denied the allegations.

On December 17, 2009, the AMF (French financial authorities) firmly rejected all accusations of wrongdoings made towards Jean-Paul Gut and the other EADS executives implied in the EADS case.

Sources and references

1961 births
French businesspeople
Matra
Sciences Po alumni
Living people